Esteban Blanco (August 3, 1929 – † October 28, 2011) was a famous football player and manager from El Salvador.

Career
Born in the district of San Miguel, he went on the play for the two biggest clubs from that city, Águila and Dragón. He won two league titles with Dragón and three titles with Águila.

Death
On October 28, 2011, Blanco died due to cardiac problems in his home.

Achievements

External links
 - CD Aguila 

1929 births
2011 deaths
People from San Miguel, El Salvador
Association football midfielders
Salvadoran footballers
C.D. Águila footballers